Dancing with the Stars is the name of various international television series based on the format of the British TV series Strictly Come Dancing, which is distributed by BBC Studios, the commercial arm of the BBC. Currently the format has been licensed to 60 territories.

Versions have also been produced in dozens of countries across the world. As a result, the series became the world's most popular television programme among all genres in 2006 and 2007, according to the magazine Television Business International, reaching the Top 10 in 17 countries.

The show pairs a number of well known celebrities with professional ballroom dancers, who each week compete by performing one or more choreographed routines that follow the prearranged theme for that particular week. The dancers are then scored by a panel of judges. Viewers are given a certain amount of time to place votes for their favorite dancers, either by telephone or (in some countries) online. The couple with the lowest combined score provided by the judges and viewers is eliminated. This process continues until there are only two, three, or four couples left; when they have competed for the last time one couple is declared the champion and wins a trophy.

DWTS Global

International versions

 Original Version
 Currently airing
 Upcoming season
 Status unknown
 No longer airing
 Season was planned to air despite COVID-19 restrictions

China (including Hong Kong)
The Chinese version is a co-production between mainland China's HBS and Hong Kong's TVB, under licence from the BBC. In mainland China it is aired on Hunan Television and in Hong Kong on TVB Jade. The Chinese title is difficult to translate, but could be rendered as Miracle Dancing or "Miracles of Dance Moves". Each broadcaster provides five male and five female dancers, for a total of twenty. Pairs were determined by audience SMS votes.
The programme began airing in late 2007, in order to mark the anniversary of the 1997 handover of Hong Kong from the UK to the People's Republic of China.

India
The Indian version is called Jhalak Dikhhla Jaa. It was first broadcast in September 2006 on Sony Entertainment Television (SET). A lot of people confuse Dancing With The Stars with Nach Baliye which airs on StarPlus. Nach Baliye and Jhalak Dikhhla Jaa have similar content and presentation but there are minor differences in the concept. The celebrity dancers on Nach Baliye are real life couples, and work with an assigned choreographer. The dancers on Jhalak Dikhhla Jaa have one celebrity paired with a trained dancer/choreographer. A notice at the end of the show verifies that the Jhalak Dikhhla Jaa is indeed a version of Dancing With The Stars.

Indonesia
Dancing with the Star Indonesia broadcast in March 2011 on Indosiar and hosted by Choky Sitohang & Cathy Sharon.On the 1st Series The 2nd Runner up is Hengky Kurniawan & Melissa, the 1st Runner up is Yuanita Christiani & Wawan, and the winner is Fadli & Trisna. The 2nd Series which is broadcast in October–December 2011 the 2nd Runner Up is Tya Ariestya & Yana, the 1st Runner Up is Melly "SHE" & Wawan and the winner is singer Lucky Widja & Sri

Japan
The Japanese version is called Shall We Dance? It has the same title as the 1996 movie by the same name, but it has no relation to it beyond the shared name. Due to the fact that there was already a series-special dancing program, and that many cast members from it also appeared in the new program, the Japanese version was confused with a regularly scheduled version of the series-special, rather than its own version of the TV series. This one ran from 8 April 2006, to 17 March 2007 on NTV-4.

South Korea

The show has aired on MBC TV since June 10, 2011, and is hosted by Lee Deok-hwa, with co-host Lee So-ra in Season 1 while former contestant Kim Gyu-ri co-hosted the second season. The first season was won by Moon Hee-joon and his partner Ahn Hye-sang while the second season was won by Choi Yeo-jin and her partner Park Ji-woo. The 3rd Season was won by pop-singer and dancer Fei and her partner Kim Soo Ro.

Pakistan
Nachley (lit. "Dance") is the Pakistani version of Dancing with the Stars. The show is aired on ARY Digital and its theme is based around traditional Pakistani music and dance concepts.

Peru
The show had two seasons, then it was cancelled.

Winners:
 Maricielo Effio, professional dancer (2005).
 Ismael La Rosa, actor (2006).

The second dancing show was Bailando por un sueño (Dancing for a Dream) in 2008, based on a Mexican reality show with the same name, broadcast on Panamericana Televisión, but produced by a different production: GV Producciones. This show was hosted by Gisela Valcárcel and Giancarlo Chichizola and aired every Saturday night (from June to December). The show was like Dancing With The Stars, but instead of professional dancers, there were amateur dancers. They danced every week in order to win a prize: to achieve a personal/humanitarian goal or "dream". The show had 2 series and the 4 first places of each series had the chance to dance on Reyes de la Pista.

Winners:
 Season 1: Carlos Alcántara, actor and stand-up comedian; and his partner Carolina Guerra. Their "dream" was a surgery to Carolina's cornea in order to remove some ulcers, otherwise she would have lost her sight.
 Season 2: Marco Zunino, actor and singer; and his partner Jardena Ugaz, their "dream" was to give Jardena's mother an operation to remove some strange lumps that had appeared on her back.
 "Reyes de la Pista": Delly Madrid, model and business woman; and her partner José Luis Campos. They won about $280 000 in Peruvian currency and the chance to represent this country on Second Dance World Championship, in Mexico.

The next year (2009), El Show de los sueños was shown every Saturday night (from May to December) on América Televisión (channel 4) and hosted by Gisela Valcárcel and Christian Rivero. This reality show was a dancing and singing competition, therefore, there was one star, an amateur dancer, and an amateur singer per group. They performed to achieve a personal/humanitarian goal or "dream". The 3 first places of each series, 1 fourth place of series 1 and an 8th place of series 2 selected by the judges won a chance to perform on "Reyes del Show" (Show Kings).

Winners:
 Season 1: Sandra Muente, singer; and her partners the Herrera Soto brothers, whose "dream" was the rebuilding of "Lord of Luren" church, located in Ica, Peru.
 Season 2: Anna Carina, singer, songwriter and dancer; and her partners Carlos Suárez and Gabriela Noriega, whose "dream" was to give a surgery to Gabriela's older sister, who was a morbid obese and the recovery from chronic depression.
 "Reyes del Show": Jean Paul Strauss, singer, musician and songwriter; and his partners Katherine Mendoza and Luis Enrique Baca. They won about $560 000 in Peruvian currency.

Since 2010, El Gran Show (The Amazing Show) is broadcast on América Televisión (channel 4) every Saturday night (from May to December) and it's hosted by Gisela Valcárcel and Christian Rivero. This reality show is like "Bailando por un Sueño": 2 series and a "top performers series". This time, each amateur dancer represents a Peruvian city. besides, in this show, the pairs (the famous and the amateur dancer) were scored from 1 to 10 by standard judges and "V.I.P judges", who are 12 random people representing the Peruvian audience, they are weekly selected by lottery via website. The 3 first places from each series win a chance to dance on El Gran Show: Reyes del Show (Show Kings).

Winners
2010
 Season 1: Gisela Ponce de Leon, singer and actress; and her partner Rayder Vásquez, form Ica, Peru.
 Season 2: Belén Estévez, professional dancer; and her partner Gian Frank Navarro, from Lima, Peru. Their "dream" was to treat Gian Frank's 4 year-old nephew, suffering from viral encephalitis, a disease that has ridden him with scoliosis, blindness and seizures.
 "Reyes del Show": Miguel Rebosio, former soccer player; and his partner Fabianne Hayashida, from Lima, Peru. They won about $560 000 in Peruvian currency.

2011
 Season 1: Raul Zuazo, actor; and his partner Dayana Calla, from Arequipa, Peru. Their "dream" was to deploy and equip a training center for homeless children.
 Season 2: Jesus Neyra, actor; and his partner Lucero Clavijo, from Tacna, Peru. Their "dream" was to improve "Maria Domitila Lascombes" transitorial housing's infrastructure.
 "Reyes del Show": (starts in November 5th).

Russia
The Russian TV show is called "Танцы со звёздами" ("Tantsy so zvyozdami", transliterated). The first season, which began in 2006, became extremely popular. Its second season is in progress after a long delay. The format of the show is identical to that of other countries. Each pair is composed of a famous celebrity and a professional dancer.

Turkey

The Turkish version was called Yok Böyle Dans. Thirteen couples were participating in the competition. Lilia Kopylova was the head of the judging panel of four. Azra Akın won the competition with her partner Nikolai.

Ukraine

In Ukraine the show started in September 2006 on television channel 1+1 under the name "Танці з зірками" ("Tantsi z zirkamy") which stands for "Dances With The Stars". The show was hosted by Yuriy Horbunov and Tina Karol.  The star contestants were paired with famous Ukrainian dancers, who had won major international competitions.  The winners of the show were rewarded with the tour to the Rio Carnival, while the runners-up went to the Carnival on Cuba.  The show was extremely popular with Ukrainian viewers.  The show finale held on the November 26, 2006 had the TV rating of 26.83% with the share of 54.64%, meaning that a quarter of the Ukrainian population and more than half of all TV viewers at that moment watched the final.  The show overall was watched by nearly 16 million Ukrainians. The pair of Volodymyr Zelenskyy (leader of a famous Ukrainian comic troupe and future president of Ukraine) and Olena Shoptenko won the main prize.

United States

In the United States, the show is called Dancing with the Stars, which airs on ABC from 2005 to 2021 and currently on Disney+ featuring athletes, singers, actors, and professional dancers. It is currently hosted by Tyra Banks and Alfonso Ribeiro. The show is a huge hit since it debuted in 2005. The Spanish-language network Univision also has its own version in 2010 under the name Mira Quien Baila ("Look Who's Dancing"). The Mirror Ball trophy is manufactured by the New York firm Society Awards. In addition, ABC debuted the Juniors version of the show on October 7, 2018, with Jordan Fisher and Frankie Muniz as hosts. In September 2019, ABC cancelled the Junior counterpart after one season.

Multiple appearances
 Pamela Anderson: competitor in seasons 10 and 15 American, 7 Argentinian and 9 French. She was a guest on Israeli season 6.
 Helena Vondrackova: competitor in seasons 1 Slovak and 6 Polish.
 Marcin Mroczek: competitor in season 4 Polish and 4 Ukrainian.
 Natalia Mohylevska: competitor in season 1, 3 and 5 Ukrainian.
 Jamala: competitor in season 9 Ukrainian and 26 Polish.

See also
Bước nhảy hoàn vũ (Vietnamese version)
List of reality television show franchises

References

External links

 Albania official website
  Canal 13's Showmatch website (Argentina)
 Armenian Website (In English)
 Australia official website
  Austria official website
 Belgium official website
 Bulgaria official website
  Chile official website
  Croatian official website
  StarDance  ...když hvězdy tančí – Czech Republic official website
 "Vild Med Dans" official website (in Danish)
 Finland official website
 German official website
 Greece official website
 India official website
 Israel official website
  Italy official website
  Japan official website
  Korea official website
 Malaysia official website
 Netherlands official website
  Norway official website
 Poland official website
 Portugal official website
 Official Romanian website
 official website Slovakian version
 Sweden official website
 Turkish version
 Ukrainian official website
 U.K. official website
 U.S. official website
 The Official Site of Dancing with the Stars (Vietnam)

 
Television franchises